Conversation in The Cathedral (original title: Conversación en La catedral) is a 1969 novel by Spanish-Peruvian writer and essayist Mario Vargas Llosa, translated by Gregory Rabassa. One of Vargas Llosa's major works, it is a portrayal of Peru under the dictatorship of Manuel A. Odría in the 1950s, and deals with the lives of characters from different social strata. The ambitious narrative is built around the stories of Santiago Zavala and Ambrosio respectively; one the son of a minister, the other his chauffeur. A random meeting at a dog pound leads to a riveting conversation between the two at a nearby bar known as the cathedral (hence the title). During the encounter Zavala tries to find the truth about his father's role in the murder of a notorious Peruvian underworld figure, shedding light on the workings of a dictatorship along the way.

The protagonist of the novel, Santiago Zavala, is a student of the National University of San Marcos in Lima and an activist with the group Cahuide against the dictatorship of the government of Peru; Santiago is based on some real life experiences of Vargas Llosa, during his first years at University of San Marcos and as a member of the activist group Cahuide. In the novel, the protagonist Santiago Zavala depicts a pessimistic view of Peruvian society during the 1950s, at the same time he is embracing the mediocrity. More generally, the novel is an examination of the deep roots of corruption and failure in Peruvian politics and government during the 1950s. The second sentence of the English translation of the novel poses the question "At what precise moment had Peru fucked itself up?"

See also

National University of San Marcos
Manuel A. Odría

Notes

References
.
.

1969 novels
Novels by Mario Vargas Llosa
Political novels
Novels set in Lima
Fiction set in the 1950s
Seix Barral books